The Dactyliocerassandstein Formation (also known as Epsilonkalksandstein Formation) is a Lower Jurassic (Lower Toarcian) geologic formation primarily located in Bavaria, Germany. The Formation appears on places like Bruck in der Oberpfalz, the north-east of the Banz Abbey, Wittelshofen, Regensburg and Bodenwöhr. In the astly foreland it extends from the Kulmbach area via Bayreuth, Creussen, Hirschau and Amberg to Schwandorf. Its southernmost known occurrences seems to be Schwandorf himself and Haselbach, although is also found at Bachhausen, far at the south. Is composed mostly by clusters of clay sandstone and sand-lime stone facies (shale, slightly bituminous in layers, and sandstone, lias sand, sand marl, marl, oolithic limestone and sand-lime banks) occurs only in the south-east of the northern Bavarian Jura region, for example at the edge of the granite Bavarian forest. On its northern edge, it is noticeably less tectonically disturbed in the Bodenwoehr basin near Sollbach. On the western edge it only appears on the Keilberg (east of Regensburg) and Irlbach (NE Regensburg).
It is a deposit recovered  It is the same age as the marine Posidonia Shale, and has been identified as part of it in many sources. The formal relationship between the two layers, however, is undefined; the Posidonia Shale is sometimes described as a different coeval unit or a changed sector, possibly with more terrestrial influence. The extent of the major outcrop of the formation is not clearly delimited. It has been observed in Straßkirchen, Bogen, Straubing; its westernmost points are in Pfatter and a deep outcrop in Keilberg. The name of the Formation derives from the presence of Dactylioceras commune and annulatum, as part of the Monotis-Dactylioceras Bed present along the Lower Toarcian deposits on Bavaria. This Dactylioceras bank was recognized as the facies of the peel-poor bank, and was not destroyed in the Bifrons regression, hence the acummulation of Ammonites and the name of the layer. Is even preserved in the coastal area of the sand deposit, when the regression probably increased the transportability of the water so large that the thin, light Pseudomonotis (=Arctotis) shells were moved, but not the heavy ones, which at that time already contained sands filled of Dactylioceras specimens.

Geology
The geology of the northern city of Regensburg at the Keilberg Quarry is determined by the north–south Kilberg Fault of the Keilberg Rift, the main fault in the Regensburg Basin. Developed by the sinking of the southern German Jura Plateau during the Miocene, it separates the higher, older crystallization of the Moldanubian Basement from the Lower Jurassic chalk complex of the eastern Franconian Jura which includes the Epsilonkalksandstein Formation. The oldest marine documentation near Regensburg is the Hettangian Arietites Sandstone, which indicates that the gradual south-eastern advance of the sea was not uninterrupted at the beginning: many gaps in layers, the formation of channels and transgression, and processing horizons. The Pliensbachian is recovered locally with a series of red-iron facies, probably deposited near a beach in a series of very thin, changing layers. During the late Pliensbachian, the zone became a relatively narrow, flat deposit area which flooded during the early Toarcian (except on the east of the Keilberg Quarry); it reemerged during the Bifrons substage with a changing coastline, thanks to rhythmic uplifts and subsidence of older Paleozoic and Triassic siliciclastic deposits from the east. The granites and gneisses resulting from crystallization were eroded from the Paleozoic exposures on the east, and were deposited on the Jurassic prograded alluvial nearshore sandstone from the Epsilonkalksandstein Formation to the Bajocian layers. The younger limes of the Late Jurassic emerge further west, covering the fault, and are mined in the southern part of the Keilberg Quarry; they are visible from a distance. The Callovian and Tithonian limestones which overspread the local slopes contain substantial chert. The narrow lias band on the Keilberg emerged on the Cenozoic as a result of sinking at the Keilberg Rift jump: in the south is the Upper Lias in the Tegernheim Gorge as a result of the (Oligocene?) pressure of the granite from the west, accompanied by a shifting of the leaves and by partial tearing of the upper lias, dragged almost up to a vertical erection (80 ° SW). The oolithic Limestone banks were severely shattered, which manifests itself in abundant Calcite-healed fissures, limonistic veins and armor formation. This can also be seen in the upper limestone marl and marl limestone. In the north, the Oberlias south of Irlbach is clearly erect, but hardly influenced by tectonics.
The slopes of the Keilberg Quarry are partially covered by till, soliflucted rubble and loess from the Würm glaciation. The poor deposition suggests that the ice sheets, like those of the rest of the Quaternary glaciation, never crossed the Regensburg area; there was an ice-free corridor between the Fennoscandian ice sheet and the Alpine glaciers.

Paleogeography 
On the Jurassic the zone of the east of Regensburg (mostly on the Tegernheim Gorge) is well known, and shows constant changes and evolution. On the lower jurassic (Lias) a Sea Wedge pushed from the north into the area of Regensburg and formed a Lagoon in which sands and an Iron Ore facies near the coast were deposited ("Keilbergsandstein" and "Arietitessandstein" mostly on the Hettangian, Sinemurian and its maximum extension on the Toarcian Epsilonkalksandstein). Towards the Toarcian the sea gradually advanced to the southeast (Keilberg to the Danube outcrops), so the marine influence in Regensburg increased until the Bifrons Substage of the Toarcian, where the sandstones return and cover all the deposits. It is even more difficult to judge the distance from the coast than in the case of the marine (Hettangian) Angulate Sandstone, which strikes a very broad band as the edge facies of the predominantly clayey angulate strata preserved in Upper Franconia. The Coast probably developed in the direction of the Bohemian-Vindelician highlands, but according to the sandy and/or oolithic development of the upper Liassic facies there is not any superficial guarantee of deposits really close to the coast. The only deposit that shows a proper semiterrestrial derivation is the Calcareous "White Epsilonsandstein". During mostly of the deposition, as with the Angulate sandstone, the beach may have been many kilometers east of today's Paleozoic Massifs, with recovering of nearshore, backshore and breaker zone deposits on the 4 last levels of the formation.

The Toarcian deposits are mostly influenced by the Posidonia Shale, a primarily a marine formation, influenced by landforms which provided most of the terrestrial matter found along the Epsilonkalksandstein Formation. The main structure of the formation was dispersed along modern southern Germany, including present-day Holzmaden, Ohmden and (on the north) Lower Saxony; other facies are in the east, near Banz Abbey and Bohemia. The Epsilonkalksandstein Formation is a seashore linked to the Southwest German Basin, the main Posidonia deposit. Abyssal depression sedimentation has not yet been found. The Paris Basin, which covered central France, contains sedimentation similar to the Posidonia Shale. It was also primarily a pelagic to open-shelf deposit, without major abyssal sedimentation. In the east the SW German sub-basin was bounded by the Bohemian-Hercynian landmass (Modern Bohemian Massif). Between the Hettangian-Toarcian, this threshold was perhaps temporarily connected via a land bridge with an island in the area of the Aarmassif. The last remains of this land bridge are finally submerged in the Middle Toarcian and the Swabian basin went into open connection with the Helvetic deposit area. The Vindelician High has been represented as a peninsula of the Bohemian Massif, or an isolated landmass. The south was connected by the Austrian channel with the Manganschiefer facies on the Toarcian Bavaric Nappe (a series of deposits with dominant Magnese shale) and the bituminous marls of the Bächental valley in modern Tyrol (pelagic sediment).

After the Toarcian on the Epsilonkalksandstein, the characteristics of the existing rocks still indicate the proximity to the beach until the middle Dogger (Middle Jurassic), concretely until the Bathonian when the Regensburg Bay expanded and formed the "Regensburger Strasse" with fully marine conditions that prevailed various millions of years.  This transgression lasted into the Upper Kimmeridgian when Coral Reefs were formed and plate limestone was deposited in the tubs in between. Then the sea retreated in the Tithonian and the Jurassic Sea flattened out.  Ultimately, at the beginning of the Cretaceous Period, the area fell dry and karstified heavily. The karst cavities were filled in the Cenomanian with material transported by rivers.

Strata

The not uncommon occurrence of the Dactylioceras athleticum in the Limonite sandstone is the main identifier for the formation, as slabs with tiny ammonite species, and it is considered an equivalent, or the same unit, of the Athleticus-subcarinatus bank (Named For the Same Ammonite species) that is so widespread in northern Bavaria composed mostly by Limestone facies. This formation is outcrops along Bavaria secured by the following facts: In the Bodenwohrer Basin, where this plate is very similarly formed in terms of geology, as in between Vorder and Hinterthurn is teeming with Dactylioceras athleticum specimens of different varieties, but leads like in the limestone facies, whose dominant ammonite is Hildoceras bifrons. The roof of the Dactytioceras strata is seen on mostly of the locations (= biostratigraphically limited on moslty exposures to the Bifrons strata). This now allows a clear demarcation of the range of the formation. With a lightness of 16–17 m, the Dactylioceras layers in the clayey finely sanded Irlbach outcrop are twice as thick as the Posidonia Shale-Epsilonsandstein facies near Wittelshofen (8 m) or the slate and limestone facies near Aschach bei Amberg (over 8.25 m), four times as much the shale and stinky limestone facies at the North of the Banz Abbey (over 4 m) and over 25 times the pure limestone facies of Neumarkt in der Oberpfalz (0.6 m). These few details contain remarkable palaeographic references, which go into in detail above the Dactylioceras athleticum plate, sandy below, marly above. The white sand Karst environment-derived on some layers can suggest not only a Shore deposition, but also a Cenote-like deposit at least in one sequence.

The formation is recovered completely at the on Bavaria, specially on Regensburg, where a narrow NS strip along the lias exposures that strikes in the eastern half of Keilberg, from Irlbach via Grüntal to Tegernheimer Keller at the South east. Its appearance N-S is evidenced by the Grünthal 1, 11, 111 and Keilberg 1 boreholes. The Shale facies occupy the lower two thirds (6.35- 7.30 m) of the epsilon layer sequence, while the limestone facies the upper third (2.70-4.20 m) on mostly of the Boreholes, indicating a sea Transgression.
At this part a north-north-east-south-south-west closes to the west running stripe, seen on the Boreholes Grünthal IV, V, VI and Keilberg 1/55, where the Clay Shale develops a thickness of 9–12 m and the Lower Toarcian layer sequence increases. This strip goes west of the Gonnersdorf-Walhallastraße line, recovered on the boreholes Keilberg 1/53, 2155, 3/56 and Keilberg 11 into the area in which the Epsilonkalksandstein Limestone recover all the profile top to bottom (borehole 1/53), indicating a more nearshore deposition than the open marine influenced deposits with Posidonia Shale.

The main level was reported from the Irlbach Slates (Liasaufschlubs von Irlbach, a now-destroyed outcrop north of Regensburg on the road between Grüntal and Irlbach),) where a  series of leafy slate outcrops (mainly from the Posidonia Shale or with strata from it) developed; the last  are parallel to a series of sandstone levels overlaying a small section of the marine strata. There the Posidonia Shale is present at least 5 m on the Irlbach Profile composed by Clay-Slate in their lower part, overlayed by the fine-grain slate sandstone of the Epsilonkalksandstein about 10 m thick. The border towards the Jurensismergel Formation is only 15 to 20 cm thick and forms a Dactylioceras bank like in the coeval deposits of the Bodenwöhr Basin. A Monotis-Dactylioceras bank has not been developed here.

At Bodenwöhr the formation appears as a series of calcareous facies with marine shells. In the Toarcian profile of Naab is composed by Limestone containing Quartz grains which filled with Arctotis substriata. The outcrop resembles the formation here on the eastern edge of the Franconian Alb. In the Bodenwöhr basin itself, the Lower Toarcian consists mostly of sandstones and only a minor part of shale (-3 m). At Bruck in der Oberpfalz, Dactylioceras athleticum is found in a bank-shaped, fine-grained form yellow sandstones. The outcrops are badly preserved on some parts, which is why the Thickness cannot be determined precisely, tougth is calculated to be up to 8 m.

The sandstone level of the formation prograde and occupy all the level after the Bifrons substage, establishing a mixture of arenaceous facies, tubular-cylindrical Tempestites, wavy-bedded sands, flaser-laminated sands and cross-bedded sands. A series of sandstone-limestone facies, southeast of the Naab and north of Irlbach, is in the upper part of the Lower Toarcian strata overlaying the marine deposits. The local alates are described as soft, dark-gray to black, heavily impregnated with charcoal, and clearly showing the remains of the stems, roots, and other parts of plants. The slate levels which are contemporary with the sandstone change to a light-gray to almost-white slate made of muddy clay material (especially at the Tegernheimer Keller Clay Pit and north Regensburg), where plant remains are deposited.

The "Vorderkeilberg Quarry" is a now-filled Lias sandstone quarry located near the Große Doline Schauergrube and on another exposure near the Keilberg Church. Is the second outcrop of the formation, located over Hettangian (Lias alpha I and II Quartzite) strata (with the index ammonites Psiloceras & Schlotheimia). The outcrops lack Sinemurian-Pliensbachian (With the exception of Spinatum Limestones on Vorderkeilberg). The Epsilonkalksandstein here has a thickness of nearly 5 m and is composed mostly by Sandstone wit Limestone inserts. It underlies the Variabilis Limes and Cuaternary dull brown rich in mica, significantly stratified Loess.

The sandstone layers are part of a seashore series which overlies marl deposits and underlie limestone strata, part of a series of deltaic facies which changed due to local trangressions and regressions. They are distinctive due to their Bifrons-age ammonites and clams of the genus Inoceramus. The latter are referred to as Dactylioceras sandstone by Pompeckj (1901), and the major outcrop was deposited during the Early Toarcian near Irlbach above the Posidonia Shale. They overlay slightly bituminous, arenaceous, grey falciferum-zone shale. It was recovered at the Keilberg boreholes as a  Limestone-sandstone layer with injections of silt, feldspar and plagioclase, with insertions of indeterminate argillite fragments on marine biotic material.

Stratigraphy
Since the rocks of the Hettangian-Bajocian in the Regensburg area are deposits near the coast, their differ from the rocks of the same age in the rest of the Franconian Jura, more open marine or Pelagic. Thus, the formation names for the Southern Franconian Alb do not apply to the Regensburg area. As formation names have yet been officially defined for this units the works referred to this location usually use the Quenstedt method, with the Jurassic divided by the Greek letters α to ζ or its Franconian Alb coeval units.

The layers of the Lias are in the area of the village of Keilberg and run in a north–south direction. The first Jurassic depostits belong to the Lias α 1-2 (Hettangian) ("Keilbergsandstein"), which run along the eastern edge of the village of Keilberg and extends into the Tegernheim Gorge, where it is cut off by a fault running east–west. Is composed by fine-grained Quartz sandstones are flamed yellow-white-red and are very hard and weatherproof due to the silicification. The lower meters of the 8 to 10 m thick layers consist of yellow-brown, moderately consolidated, fine-grain quartz sandstones with  well sorted and poorly rounded components.

The second Lower Jurassic level is composed by the Lias α3 + β + γ (Sinemurian + Lower Pliensbachian) known as "Arietensandstein" or the equivalent of the Numismalismergel Formation. Is composed by sandstones of up to one millimeter large, unrounded and poorly sorted quartz grains that are cemented by a very fine-grained, yellowish to red matrix. Other pieces are again well sorted, medium-grained and less sanding, and brownish in color.  Quartz and a number of other unidentified, unrounded minerals are found as components.

The Lias δ, Upper Pliensbachian (Amaltheenton Formation?) in Regensburg is different completely from the Amaltheenton of the rest of the Franconian Jura, represented here by an oolithic  red iron ore. It is a clayey, queasy red iron earth made of fine-olithic base material of brown and red iron oids with brown iron ore. Three different genera of gastropods  were obtained, the are also rust-red colored: Cylindrobullina domeria, Levipleura blainvillei and several indeterminable species.

The Lias ε, Lower Toarcian is composed by a nine meters thick Posidonia Shale. It consist of bituminous, fine-layered clay marl. The Epsilonkalksandstein is deposited parallel to the Posidonia Shale until the bifrons substage, where it occupies all the deposit as result of a local terrestrial progradation. The Epsilonkalksandstein Formation, as the older "Keilbergsandstein", has been interpreted as a fine sand deposit in a constricted lagoon, whereby the material was transported far from the north by ocean currents. The sandstone of both levels contains digs which can be compared with those in today's Wadden Sea and which therefore identify this a near-marine deposit. The strata of the Epsilonkalksandstein is well measured on some boreholes:

{| class="wikitable"
|+Stratigraphy of the formation at the Keilberg 1/53 borehole
!Unit 
!Lithology
!Area 
!Palynology
!Fossil fauna
|-
|
Youngest
|
Series of Prograded Banked, gray Sandstone rich in Mica and Kaolinite, partly carbonate, softer at the bottom. Alternated gray-reddish Mudstones with Galena and traces of Moscovite. Small Iron Ore concretions are found.
|
; thickness 
|style="background:#D1FFCF;" |
Not reported
|
Not reported
|-
|
N1
|
Gray-reddish Limestone marls with layers filled with mussel shells. Kaolinite and siderites appear on intermittent Grey Mudstone injections. 
|
; thickness 
|style="background:#D1FFCF;" |
Plant chaff
|
Mussels
|-
|
N2
|
Hard marl grey, brown and red limestone, rich in mica. Galena with sandstone traces and marine biota is recovered on the lower part. 2 small bodies of Mudstone are recovered on the lowermost section
|
; thickness 1 m
|style="background:#D1FFCF;" |
Plant chaff

|
Belemnites
|-
|
N3
|
Gray sandstone-limestone bricks, along with thin banks rich in mica. Iron Ore concretions are rare.
|
; thickness 
|style="background:#D1FFCF;" |
Limonite prints from driftwood
Plant Cuticles (Gnetales?)
|
Dactylioceras sp.
Dactylioceras commune 
Dactylioceras annulatum 
Pseudomytiloides cf. amygdaloides 
|-
|-
|
N4
|
Gray, hard sandstone rich in mica
|
; thickness 1 m
|style="background:#D1FFCF;" |
Limonite prints from driftwood
Plant Chaff
Plant Cuticles (Coniferales, Gnetales?)
|
Dactylioceras sp.
Dactylioceras commune 
Dactylioceras annulatum 
Pseudomytiloides cf. amygdaloides 
|-
|-
|
Oldest
|
Yellow-reddish Sandstone. Thin, flat dark brown Slate with abundant wood cuticles and injections of Limestone
|

|style="background:#D1FFCF;" |
Wood cuticles
|
Hildoceras sp. cf. bifrons
Coeloceras cf. mucronatum'''Pseudogrammoceras cf. saemanniPseudogrammoceras cf. quadratumPseudogrammoceras cf. expeditiumBelemnitte Phragmocones
Belemnitte RostrumPseudomytiloides cf. cinctusDapedium politumHybodus sp.Synechodus sp.|-
|}

Finally, the Lower Jurassic ends locally with the Lias ζ, Upper Toarcian (Jurensismergel Formation? & Variabilis-Aalensis Limes) which consists of medium-fine to medium-grain marl stones and limestones as well as red Feldspars.

Environment

Major terrestrial environments linked with the Posidonia Shale on the east include the Paleozoic Vindelician High and Bohemian Massif. A large influx of organic matter originated in Fennoscandia.Song, J., Littke, R., & Weniger, P. (2017). "Organic geochemistry of the lower Toarcian Posidonia Shale in NW Europe". Organic Geochemistry, 106, 76–92. Algae limestone was found in several places in Württemberg in the upper Lower Toarcian levels, which proves that at the time of the Toarcian the sea in the central part of the Swabian basin was probably less than 100 m deep. This Algae deposits where located in the Toarcian at 110 km from the coas, the sea floor therefore only had an average depth of 0.1 m to 100 m at the most. Based on isotope determinations on belemnite rusts, climate and water temperature was calculated, with results of 13.2-29.5 °, on average 21.4 °, subtropical to tropical conditions. The deposit area of the Swabian Lower-Middle Jurassic can be characterized as a basin that was shallow, had a level surface and was connected to the open sea via equally shallow connecting paths and other partial basins, only indirectly. It was located in a relatively warm, precipitation-rich climate and received freshwater inflows from the eastern continent, which temporarily lowered the salinity of the seawater in the whole basin or in parts. The Dactylocerassandstein Formation extended toward the Bohemian shores. The margins of the SWGB as well as the hinterland relief had very gentle topography, and therefore fine-grained siliciclastic sediments could likely have been deposited even in the nearshore area of the basin.Röhl, H. J., & Schmid-Röhl, A. (2005). Lower Toarcian (Upper Liassic) black shales of the Central European epicontinental basin: a sequence stratigraphic case study from the SW German Posidonia Shale. The Flora suggest a dry Inland setting, dominated by Conifers and Bennetitales.Frimmel, A. (2003). Hochau. ösende Untersuchungen von Biomarkern an epikontinentalen Schwarzschiefern des Unteren Toarciums (Posidonienschiefer, Lias ε) von SW-Deutschland.

A series of prograding sandstones with ammonites follows a local sea regression during the Bifrons substage of the Lower Toarcian. It was part of the coast of the western Bohemian Massif, where a possible parallel coal basin developed near the sea. The environment covered a series of marginal marine-to-delta environments on the east, where a variety of marine and terrestrial deposits are found: lagoon, barrier, and mangrove. Reported material from 1930s drilling included an input of Carboniferous-derived matter from the Bohemian Massif, probably carried by rivers. Most of the biota reported are marine and nearly identical to that in the contemporaneous Posidonia Shale, although it has marks of transportation and deposition. The Epsilonkalksandstein Formation ecosystem is followed on the northwest by Altdorf bei Nürnberg biota, primarily marine fauna but including terrestrial biota such as pterosaurs and turtles.

Local sea-level fluctuations in Altdorf are known to result in fossil shell concentrations, suggesting that a local regression transported deposited Arctotis from the basin margin to a more distant area. The major argument for regression is the progradation of Bifrons Sandstone over Falciferum shales at the basin margin, confirmed by later drilling. The transition from slate to sandstone in  Regensburg, Bruck and Naab areas is considered as caused by a regression of the sea. This regression must have reached its greatest extent around the turn of the Middle-Upper Lower Toarcian. This is the only way to explain the enrichment of shells to the shell-rich facies of Monotis-Dactylioceras Bank, as because of the flattening, a negative sediment gradient occurred for the coastal areas that distally turned into a selective negative, with the sediments and the shells contained therein were removed from the marginal parts, the shells were deposited further away from the coast, but all the finer parts were carried on. In addition, there were the shells that were originally present here, which were not transported but were enriched by the removal of the inorganic sediment parts, giving as result a marine reading blanket, the shell-rich facies of the Monotisbank, as it appears in such great development on the western edge of the northern Franconian Alb. The regression is not in relation to the width of the really dry area, was limited to the edge area, but its effect on the sediments was regional as a result of the reduction in the height of the water column above it. The Monotis-Dactylioceras bank is an excellent fossilized record of events trecorded and measured on the modern mangrove coast of Brazil: a selective-positive sediment gradient, which carries on all sediments that are finer than the shells, or a previous phase of selectively negative gradient, which removes such older sediments and leaves shell-like ceilings behind.

A detailed sedimentological analysis of these marginal-marine Toarcian sandstones is still outstanding; another theory is that their progradation may reflect a high sea level. Due to the presence of plant and insect (Coleoptera) remains, it is interpreted as a nearshore unit. The presence of abundant plant and coleopterae on the contemporaneous Upper Palatinate biota links them as terrestrial units. The climate of the region was probably dry, based on the abundance of pollen from Classopollis'' (Cheirolepidiaceae) and other drought-tolerant plants. Local carbon levels may be related to the increase of wildfires, also recorded on the Lower Toarcian Blanowice Formation (the eastern shore of the Bohemian Massif).

During the lower Toarcian is observed on several locations (Rietheim, Dotternhausen, Holzmaden,...) a clear increase of detrital input, more extensive than in one other part of the Lower Toarcian, suggesting an enhanced terrestrial discharge resulting from a strongly accelerated Hydrological Cycle, probably derived from the Volcanism of the coeval Karoo event and the Úrkút Manganese Ore Formation submarine-nearmarine exposures, inducing intensification of greenhouse conditions during the early Toarcian Anoxic event. This changes on the Hydrological cycle caused a higher continental weathering rates, delivering greater amounts of Kaolinite (Recovered locally on Keilberg). Coeval measured strata shows that the seawater osmium-isotope excursion in the NW Tethys Ocean  suggest a warm and humid climate as well along this transient increase in continental weathering rates. At the same time, numerical models recovering regional hydrologic responses to large-scale atmospheric circulation patterns during the Early Jurassic indicate that strong Monsoonal circulation dominated along the mid-latitude coasts of Tethys and Panthalassa during the Early Toarcian. The monsoons where probably derived and associated with localized pressure cells controlled by local topography and coastal geography. Large continental areas or islands like the Bohemian Massif-Vindelician Land were involved on a meridional trade-wind/monsoon-wind circulation pattern.

The shores of the west Bohemian Massif-North Vindelician Land were influenced by monsoon conditions and heavy rains which struck most of the nearshore settings, causing the large accumulation of insect remains found on the epicontinental layers. Southern summers with humid south-west monsoon conditions occur on most of the emerged lands, followed by winters with dry, north-eastern trade winds. Those were related to seasonal rafts on the formation linked to the life cycle of stem crinoids, probably the main source of seeds and species interchange between landmasses. The Posidonia Shale indicates that monsoon rains and high runoff rate produced an estuarine water circulation, with an outflow of brackish water towards the Tethys Ocean.

Fossils

Porifera
In the non-bituminous facies of this unit, it seen and increased amount of pyritized individual needles of silica sponges (Demospongiae and Hexactinellida), rarely on pelagic layers to very often on the low depth marine deposits. They are usually associated with radiolarian stone cores. This Sponge Remains are found specially on Bodenwöhr and Amberg, being less common on Irlbach. These needles are absent in the bituminous horizons of the entire Lower Toarcian.

Annelida

Brachiopoda

Bivalvia

Gastropoda

Cephalopoda
Several Ammonoidea and Belemnitida fossils have not yet been identified.

Thoracica

Insecta
Several insect remains were noted, but not described. Insects were proabably washed into the sea during local monsoon conditions.

Echinodermata

Chondrichthyes

Actinopteri
Teeth, scales and spines have been noted, but not yet described.

Ichthyosauria

Plesiosauria

Thalattosuchia

Palynology

Plantae
A large number of wood fragments have been noted, but not yet studied.

See also 
 List of fossiliferous stratigraphic units in Germany
 List of fossiliferous stratigraphic units in Poland
 Toarcian turnover
 Toarcian formations
Marne di Monte Serrone, Italy
 Calcare di Sogno, Italy
 Djupadal Formation, Central Skane
 Sachrang Formation, Austria
 Saubach Formation, Austria
 Krempachy Marl Formation, Poland and Slovakia
 Lava Formation, Lithuania
 Azilal Group, North Africa
 Whitby Mudstone, England
 Fernie Formation, Alberta and British Columbia
 Poker Chip Shale
 Whiteaves Formation, British Columbia
 Navajo Sandstone, Utah
 Los Molles Formation, Argentina
 Mawson Formation, Antarctica
 Kandreho Formation, Madagascar
 Kota Formation, India
 Cattamarra Coal Measures, Australia

References 

Geologic formations of Germany
Toarcian Stage
Jurassic System of Europe
Jurassic Germany
Sandstone formations
Source rock formations
Fossiliferous stratigraphic units of Europe
Paleontology in Germany